Suture, literally meaning "seam", may refer to:

Arts, entertainment, and media
 Suture (album), a 2000 album by American Industrial rock band Chemlab
 Suture (film), a 1993 film directed by Scott McGehee and David Siegel
 Suture (band), an early 1990s band with Kathleen Hanna, Sharon Cheslow, and Doug Birdzell

Healthcare
 Suture (anatomy), a rigid joint between hard parts of animals
 Suture (joint), concerning the major joints in the bones of the cranium
 Ammonitic suture, the intersection of the septum with the outer shell in Ammonites
 Facial suture (trilobite), divisions in the cephalon (head) of most trilobites, along which the exoskeleton splits during molting
 Surgical suture, a stitch used by doctors and surgeons to hold tissue together

Science
 Suture (geology), a major fault through an orogen or mountain range
 Suture, a seam in a fruit capsule